The 2017–18 TSG 1899 Hoffenheim season is the 119th season in the football club's history and 10th consecutive and overall season in the top flight of German football, the Bundesliga, having been promoted from the 2. Bundesliga in 2008. In addition to the domestic league, 1899 Hoffenheim also is participating in this season's editions of the domestic cup, the DFB-Pokal, and the first-tier continental cup, the UEFA Champions League. This is the 10th season for Hoffenheim in the Wirsol Rhein-Neckar-Arena, located in Sinsheim, Baden-Württemberg, Germany. The season covers a period from 1 July 2017 to 30 June 2018.

Players

Squad information

Competitions

Overview

Bundesliga

League table

Results summary

Results by round

Matches

DFB-Pokal

UEFA Champions League

Play-off round

UEFA Europa League

Group stage

Statistics

Appearances and goals

|-
! colspan=14 style=background:#dcdcdc; text-align:center| Goalkeepers

|-
! colspan=14 style=background:#dcdcdc; text-align:center| Defenders

|-
! colspan=14 style=background:#dcdcdc; text-align:center| Midfielders

|-
! colspan=14 style=background:#dcdcdc; text-align:center| Forwards

|-
! colspan=14 style=background:#dcdcdc; text-align:center| Players transferred out during the season

References

TSG 1899 Hoffenheim seasons
Hoffenheim, TSG 1899
Hoffenheim, TSG 1899
Hoffenheim, TSG 1899